John Armar Lowry-Corry, 8th Earl Belmore (born 4 September 1951), is an Irish peer and the son of Galbraith Lowry-Corry, 7th Earl Belmore.

Early years and education

Lord Belmore, who was born into a famous Anglo-Irish aristocratic family, was educated first at Portora Royal School in Enniskillen, County Fermanagh, at the school's preparatory department, and then at his father's alma mater Lancing College, followed by two years at the Royal Agricultural College, Cirencester. He had succeeded his father in the earldom at the age of 9, and, following his education, he returned home to the family seat at Castle Coole to help manage the house and estate, which had been transferred to the care of the National Trust in 1951.

Castle Coole

Lord Belmore developed a good relationship with the trust and has spent the past two decades adding to the collection of art at Castle Coole. He commissioned Enniskillen-born artist T.P. Flanagan to produce a series of watercolours and oils of the house.

His most important acquisition was a painting of the 'heavenly twins' Castor and Pollux by Giovanni Battista Cipriani. Dated 1783, it was one of three paintings commissioned for Houghton Hall in Norfolk and was purchased by Lord Belmore in 1990. The painting is so large that it had to be brought into the house through the Breakfast Room window and without its frame.

Another important purchase was 'The Leslie Conversation Piece' by J.H. Mortimer, which had previously been at Castle Leslie in Glaslough, a village in the north-east corner of County Monaghan. Painted by Mortimer in 1770, the picture portrays some of the most colourful and prosperous landowners of the day, including Lord Mornington, who was ennobled by the King for his music making and is seen in the picture entertaining the company at the piano. The painting now hangs in the State Bedroom which the 2nd Earl had decorated in a lavish style for a planned visit by King George IV, who never came, preferring to dally with his mistress Lady Conyngham at Slane Castle instead.

Lord Belmore was also on the board of the National Gallery of Ireland for five years, including a period as vice chairman.

Family

Lord Belmore was married on 8 September 1984 to Lady Mary Jane Meade (b. 12 July 1952), second daughter of John Charles Edmund Carson Meade, 6th Earl of Clanwilliam (1914-1989), by his wife Catherine Loyd, third daughter of Colonel Arthur Thomas Loyd, OBE, of Lockinge, Wantage, Berkshire (part of the Oxfordshire admin area since 1974), and has issue:

John Armar Galbraith Lowry-Corry, styled Viscount Corry (born 2 November 1985)
The Hon. Montagu Gilford George Lowry-Corry (b. 30 March 1989)
Lady Martha Catherine Addington (b. 27 May 1992)

Lord and Lady Belmore and their family live at the Garden House at Castle Coole, while their son Viscount Corry often uses private apartments at the main house.

References

1951 births
Living people
People educated at Lancing College
John
Earls Belmore